Damon Graham Devereux Hill,  (born 17 September 1960) is a British former professional racing driver from England and the 1996 Formula One World Champion. He is the son of Graham Hill, and, along with Nico Rosberg, one of two sons of a Formula One World Champion to also win the title. He started racing on motorbikes in 1981, and after minor success moved on to single-seater racing cars.

Hill became a test driver for the Formula One title-winning Williams team in 1992. He was promoted to the Williams race team the following year after Riccardo Patrese's departure and took the first of his 22 victories at the 1993 Hungarian Grand Prix. During the mid-1990s, Hill was Michael Schumacher's main rival for the Formula One Drivers' Championship, which saw the two clash several times on and off the track. Their collision at the 1994 Australian Grand Prix gave Schumacher his first title by a single point. He went on to drive for the less competitive Arrows and Jordan teams, and in  gave Jordan their first win.

Hill retired from racing after being dropped by Jordan following the  season. In 2006, he became president of the British Racing Drivers' Club, succeeding Sir Jackie Stewart. Hill stepped down from the position in 2011 and was succeeded by Derek Warwick. He presided over the securing of a 17-year contract for Silverstone to hold Formula One races, which enabled the circuit to see extensive renovation work. Hill currently works as part of the Sky Sports F1 broadcasting support team providing expert analysis during free practice sessions.

Personal and early life
Hill was born in Hampstead, London, to Graham and Bette Hill. Graham Hill was a racing driver in the international Formula One series. He won the world Drivers' Championship in 1962 and 1968, and became a well-known personality in the United Kingdom. Graham Hill's career provided a comfortable living. Bette (née Shubrook) was a former rower and medalist at the European Rowing Championships. By 1975 the family lived in a "25-room country mansion" in Hertfordshire and Damon attended the independent The Haberdashers' Aske's Boys' School. The death of his father in an aeroplane crash in 1975 left the 15-year-old Hill, his mother, and sisters Samantha and Brigitte in drastically reduced circumstances. Hill worked as a labourer and a motorcycle courier to support his further education.

Hill is married to Susan "Georgie" George and they have four children, including Joshua. One son was born with Down syndrome and Hill and Georgie are both patrons of the Down's Syndrome Association. In 2009, Hill also became the first patron of St. Joseph's Specialist School and College, a school for children with severe learning disabilities and autism in Cranleigh, Surrey. Joshua started racing in 2008, competing in the British Formula Renault Championship in 2011. Joshua retired from motor racing in 2013.

Hill is the Patron of the charity Disability Africa which runs inclusion projects for disabled children in African countries.

Career

Pre-Formula One

Hill started his motorsport career in motorcycle racing in 1981. He used the same simple, easily identifiable helmet design as his father: eight white oar blades arranged vertically around the upper surface of a dark blue helmet. The device and colours represent the London Rowing Club for which Graham Hill rowed in the early 1950s. Although he won a 350 cc clubman's championship at the Brands Hatch circuit, his racing budget came from working as a building labourer. He also worked as a dispatch rider for Apollo Despatch in London, then later Special Delivery, a London motorcycle dispatch company and was provided TZ350 racing bikes by them. His mother, who was concerned about the dangers of racing motorcycles, persuaded him to take a racing car course at the Winfield Racing School in France in 1983. Although he showed "above-average aptitude", Hill had only sporadic single-seater races until the end of 1984. He graduated through British Formula Ford, winning six races driving a Van Diemen for Manadient Racing in 1985, his first full season in cars, and finishing third and fifth in the two UK national championships. He also took third place in the final of the 1985 Formula Ford Festival, helping the UK to win the team prize.

For 1986, Hill planned to move up to the British Formula Three Championship with title-winning team West Surrey Racing. The loss of sponsorship from Ricoh, and then the death of his proposed teammate Bertrand Fabi in a testing accident, ended Hill's proposed drive. Hill says "When Bert was killed, I took the conscious decision that I wasn't going to stop doing that sort of thing. It's not just competing, it's doing something more exciting. I'm at my fullest skiing, racing or whatever. And I'm more frightened of letting it all slip and reaching 60 and finding I've done nothing." Hill borrowed £100,000 to finance his racing and had a steady first season for Murray Taylor Racing in 1986 before taking a brace of wins in each of the following years for Intersport. He finished third in the 1988 championship.

In Europe in the 1990s, a successful driver would usually progress from Formula Three either directly to Formula One, the pinnacle of the sport, or to the International Formula 3000 championship. However, Hill did not have enough sponsorship available to fund a drive in F3000. He says "I ended up having to reappraise my career a bit. The first thing was to realise how lucky I was to be driving anything. I made the decision that whatever I drove I would do it to the best of my ability and see where it led." He took a one-off drive in the lower level British F3000 championship and shared a Porsche 962 at Le Mans for Richard Lloyd Racing, where the engine failed after 228 laps. He also competed in one race in the British Touring Car Championship at Donington Park, driving a Ford Sierra RS500. Midway through the season, an opportunity arose at the uncompetitive Mooncraft F3000 team. The team tested Hill and Perry McCarthy. Their performances were comparable but according to the team manager, John Wickham, the team sponsors preferred the Hill name. Although his best result was a 15th place, Hill's race performances for Mooncraft led to an offer to drive a Lola chassis for Middlebridge Racing in 1990. He took three pole positions and led five races in 1990, but did not win a race during his Formula 3000 career.

Formula One

Brabham (1992)
Hill started his Grand Prix career during the 1991 season as a test driver with the championship-winning Williams team while still competing in the F3000 series. However, midway through  Hill broke into Grand Prix racing as a driver with the dying Brabham team. The formerly competitive team was in serious financial difficulties. Hill started the season only after three races, replacing Giovanna Amati after her sponsorship had failed to materialise. Amati had been unable to get the car through qualifying but Hill matched his teammate, Eric van de Poele, by qualifying for two races, the mid-season British and Hungarian Grands Prix. Hill continued to test for the Williams team that year and the British Grand Prix saw Nigel Mansell win the race for Williams, while he finished last in the Brabham. The Brabham team collapsed after the Hungarian Grand Prix and did not complete the season.

Williams (1993–96)

Traditionally, the reigning driver's World Champion carried the number "1" on his car and his teammate took the number "2". Because Mansell, the 1992 champion, was not racing in Formula One in 1993, his Williams team were given numbers "0" and "2". As the junior partner to Prost, Hill took "0", the second man in Formula One history to do so, after Jody Scheckter in 1973.

1993
Nevertheless, the race still gave Hill his first podium finish.

In the next round in Europe, Hill again finished second behind Senna and ahead of a lapped Prost. In his first full season, Hill benefited from the experience of his veteran French teammate. He continued to impress as the season went on, and in San Marino Hill took the lead at the start, though he was passed by Prost and Senna and ultimately retired with a spin due to a brake failure. Mechanical problems returned in Spain where he kept pace with Prost for most of the race only for his engine to fail.

After strong podiums in Monaco and Canada, Hill took his first career pole in France, finishing second to Prost after team orders prevented him from seriously challenging for the win. He looked set to win the  before another engine failure put him out and led the  comfortably only to suffer a puncture with two laps left, handing the win to Prost.

At the Hungarian race, Hill did take his first career win after leading from start to finish. In doing so he became the first son of a Formula One Grand Prix winner to take victory himself, and he followed it with two more wins, first at Spa where he took the lead following a pit stop problem for Prost, and then at the  where Prost's engine failed towards the end. His third consecutive win clinched the Constructors' Championship for Williams and moved him temporarily to second in the Drivers' standings. At the  Hill came from the back of the grid to third, having stalled on the warm up lap from pole. He finished the season by finishing fourth in Japan and third in Australia, though he lost second in the Drivers' Championship to Ayrton Senna, who passed Hill by winning the last two races.

1994
In , Ayrton Senna joined Hill at Williams. As the reigning champion, this time Prost, was again no longer racing, Hill retained his number '0'. The pre-season betting was that Senna would coast to the title, but the Benetton team and Michael Schumacher initially proved more competitive and won the first three races. With the team undergoing investigation from the Italian authorities on manslaughter charges, Hill found himself team leader with only one season's experience in the top flight. It was widely reported at the time that the Williams car's steering column had failed, though Hill told BBC Sport in 2004 that he believed Senna simply took the corner too fast for the conditions, referring to the fact that the car had just restarted the race with cold tyres after being slowed down by a safety car.

His race ended early in a collision involving several cars on the opening lap of the race.

Schumacher led by 66 points to 29 by the midpoint of the season. Mansell earned approximately £900,000 for each of his four races, while Hill was paid £300,000 for the entire season, though Hill's position as lead driver remained unquestioned. Schumacher was disqualified from that race and banned for two further races for overtaking Hill during the formation lap and ignoring the subsequent black flag. Four more victories for Hill, three of which were in races where Schumacher was excluded or disqualified, took the title battle to the final event at Adelaide. This put Hill just one point behind the German before the last race of the season.

Neither Hill nor Schumacher finished the season-closing , after a controversial collision which gave the title to Schumacher. Schumacher ran off the track hitting the wall with the right-hand side of his Benetton while leading. Coming into the sixth corner Hill moved to pass the Benetton and the two collided, breaking the Williams's front left suspension wishbone, and forcing both drivers' retirement from the race. BBC Formula One commentator Murray Walker, had often maintained that Schumacher did not cause the crash intentionally, but Williams co-owner Patrick Head felt differently. In 2006 he said that at the time of the incident "Williams were already 100% certain that Michael was guilty of foul play" but did not protest Schumacher's title because the team was still dealing with the death of Ayrton Senna. In 2007, Hill explicitly accused Schumacher of causing the collision deliberately.

Hill's season earned him the 1994 BBC Sports Personality of the Year.

1995
Coming into the 1995 season, Hill was one of the title favourites. The Williams team were reigning Constructors' Champions, having beaten Benetton in 1994, and with young David Coulthard, who was embarking on his first full season in Formula One, as teammate, Hill was the clear number one driver. The year seemed to start well with pole position in Brazil, although a spin while in the lead due to a mechanical problem handed the lead to Schumacher. But wins in the next two races put him in the championship lead. However, Schumacher won seven of the next twelve races, and took his second title with two races to spare, while Benetton took the Constructors' Championship. Schumacher and Hill had several on-track incidents during the season, two of which led to suspended one-race bans for both.

1996
In  the Williams car was clearly the quickest in Formula One and Hill went on to win the title ahead of his teammate, reigning Indycar champion Jacques Villeneuve, becoming the first son of a Formula One champion to win the championship himself. Taking eight wins and never qualifying off the front row, Hill enjoyed by far his most successful season. At Monaco, where his father had won five times in the 1960s, he led until his engine failed, curtailing his race and allowing Olivier Panis to take his only Formula One win. Near the end of the season, Villeneuve began to mount a title challenge and took pole in the Japanese Grand Prix, the final race of the year. However, Hill took the lead at the start and won both the race and the championship while the Canadian retired.

Despite winning the title, Hill learned before the season's close that he was to be dropped by Williams in favour of Heinz-Harald Frentzen for the following season. Hill left Williams as the team's second most successful driver in terms of race victories, with 21, second only to Mansell. Hill's 1996 World Championship earned him his second BBC Sports Personality of the Year Award, making him one of only five people to receive the award twice – the others being boxer Henry Cooper, Nigel Mansell, Andy Murray and Lewis Hamilton. Hill was also awarded the Segrave Trophy by the Royal Automobile Club. The trophy is awarded to the British national who accomplishes the most outstanding demonstration of the possibilities of transport by land, sea, air, or water.

Arrows (1997)

Hill became the fourth driver in nine years to win the World Drivers' Championship for Williams and not drive for the team the following season, as occurred with Nelson Piquet ( champion –  driver for Lotus), Nigel Mansell (1992 champion – 1993 driver in the US-based Indy Car World Series instead of F1) and Alain Prost (1993 champion – retired in 1994). As World Champion, Hill was in high demand and had offers for a race seat from McLaren, Benetton and Ferrari but not adequately financially valued despite his status. As a consequence, he opted to sign for Arrows, a team which had never won a race in its 20-year history and had scored only a single point the previous year. On a day when the Bridgestone tyres had a competitive edge over their Goodyear rivals, Hill qualified third in a car that had not previously placed higher than 9th on the grid. During the race, he passed his rival and new championship contender, Michael Schumacher, on the track and was leading late in the race, 35 seconds ahead of the eventual 1997 World Champion, Villeneuve, until a hydraulic problem drastically slowed the Arrows. Villeneuve thus passed Hill, who finished second.

Jordan (1998–99)
Only after one year with Arrows, Hill came close to signing a deal with Alain Prost's team, before deciding to instead sign up with the Jordan team for the 1998 season. His new teammate was Ralf Schumacher, younger brother of Michael. During that race, Hill progressed to second place as others retired or made pit stops for fuel. On lap 38, Michael Schumacher, who was delayed by a stop-and-go penalty after forcing Frentzen's Williams off the track, caught Hill on the home straight; Hill moved across the track three times to block Schumacher, who took the place by running over the kerbs at the last chicane. Hill then ran fourth after his only pit stop before retiring due to an electrical failure. After the race, Schumacher accused Hill of dangerous driving. Hill responded by stating that Schumacher "cannot claim anyone drives badly when you look at the things he's been up to in his career. He took Frentzen out completely." At that race, Hill was leading late in the race, with teammate Schumacher closing rapidly, when he asked the team whether they would be allowed to race each other. Team principal Eddie Jordan ordered Ralf Schumacher to hold position instead of risking losing a 1–2 finish. The victory was his first since being dropped by the Williams team.

Struggling with the newly introduced four-grooved tyres, he was outpaced by his new teammate, Heinz-Harald Frentzen, who was Hill's replacement at Williams two years prior.

Going into that race weekend, Hill announced he would retire after the Grand Prix, leading Jordan to test Jos Verstappen in case Hill had to be quickly replaced. Following a strong fifth place at his home event, however, Hill changed his mind and decided to see out the year. His best result for the remainder of the season was sixth place, which he achieved in both Hungary and Belgium. With three races of 1999 to go, there were rumours that the Prost Grand Prix team would release Jarno Trulli early after he signed for Jordan's  campaign as Hill's replacement. At the same time, his teammate, Frentzen, became a title contender going into the final few races of the season and, eventually, finished third in the championship. In so doing, both Hill and Frentzen helped Jordan to achieve its best-ever finish with a third position in the Constructors' Championship. Hill's last race was the  where he spun off the track and pulled into the pit lane citing mental fatigue.

After racing

In retirement Hill has continued to be involved with cars and motorsport. He founded the Prestige and Super Car Private Members Club P1 International with Michael Breen in 2000; Breen bought Hill out in October 2006. Hill also became involved in a BMW dealership, just outside Royal Leamington Spa, that bore his name and an Audi dealership in Exeter. In April 2006, Hill succeeded Jackie Stewart as President of the British Racing Drivers' Club (BRDC).

In 2009 he received an Honorary Fellowship from the University of Northampton recognising his successful career and his connection with Northampton through Silverstone and the BRDC.

Hill also made a UK television advert with F1 commentator Murray Walker for Pizza Hut, in which Walker commentated on Hill's meal as if it were a race. Hill has also appeared on many British television programmes, including Top Gear, This is Your Life, TFI Friday, Shooting Stars and Bang Bang, It's Reeves and Mortimer.

Hill has raced both cars and motorcycles at the Goodwood Festival of Speed, and in 2005 he tested the new GP2 Series car. He drove the  Grand Prix Masters single seater racing vehicle for a test run around the Silverstone Circuit in mid-2006. He had discussions to join the series limited to retired Formula One drivers who were aged 45 or over but these talks did not materialise in a drive. Hill served as the driver representative on the stewards' panel at the 2010 Monaco Grand Prix which decided to penalize Hill's former rival Michael Schumacher for overtaking under yellow flag conditions. The decision led to Hill receiving hate mail.

Between 18 and 19 May 2012, Hill along with Mark Blundell, Perry McCarthy, Martin Donnelly and Julian Bailey participated in the first round of the VW Scirocco R-Cup at Brands Hatch to raise funds for the Halow Charity. Hill completed seven laps of the circuit before retiring. On 7 October 2012, Hill drove his father's BRM in celebration of the 50th anniversary of having won the 1962 F1 World Championship. In June 2018, Hill became the President of the Brooklands Trust Members who are the support group for Brooklands Museum.

Hill published his autobiography, Watching the Wheels, in 2016, in which he revealed he had suffered with depression.

Broadcaster
Hill has also regularly appeared in the British media. In June 1975 he appeared alongside his father on the popular television programme Jim'll Fix It. He again appeared on the programme in January 1995, marking the twentieth anniversary of the show. He has contributed many articles to F1 Racing magazine and has twice appeared in ITV F1's commentary box, covering for Martin Brundle at the 2007 and 2008 Hungarian Grands Prix. British Sky Broadcasting signed Hill to join their F1 presentation team on Sky Sports F1 as a British driver's pundit starting from the 2012 Formula One World Championship.

Music career
Hill was interested in music from an early age and formed the punk band the "Hormones" with some friends while at school. After achieving success in Formula One, he was able to play guitar with several famous musicians, including his friend George Harrison, and appeared on "Demolition Man", the opening track of Def Leppard's 1999 album Euphoria. Hill also made a regular appearance at the British Grand Prix alongside other Formula One musicians such as Eddie Jordan. After his retirement at the end of the 1999 season, Hill devoted more time to music and played with celebrity bands including Spike Edney's SAS band, and Pat Cash's Wild Colonial Boys. Hill also formed his own band, The Conrods, which was active between 1999 and 2003 and played cover versions of well-known songs from The Rolling Stones, The Beatles and The Kinks. Since becoming president of the BRDC in 2006, Hill says he has stopped playing the guitar, being "too busy doing school runs and looking after pets."

Racing record

Career summary

Complete International Formula 3000 results
(key) (Races in bold indicate pole position; races in italics indicate fastest lap.)

Complete British Touring Car Championship results
(key) (Races in bold indicate pole position; races in italics indicate fastest lap.)

‡ Endurance driver.

24 Hours of Le Mans results

Complete Formula One results
(key) (Races in bold indicate pole position) (Races in italics indicate fastest lap)

† Did not finish, but was classified as he had completed more than 90% of the race distance.

References
Citations

Bibliography

Further reading

People from Hampstead
Sportspeople from London
Officers of the Order of the British Empire
BRDC Gold Star winners
BBC Sports Personality of the Year winners
Segrave Trophy recipients
People educated at Haberdashers' Boys' School
English racing drivers
English Formula One drivers
Brabham Formula One drivers
Williams Formula One drivers
Arrows Formula One drivers
Jordan Formula One drivers
Formula One race winners
Formula One World Drivers' Champions
Formula Ford drivers
British Formula Three Championship drivers
British Formula 3000 Championship drivers
British Touring Car Championship drivers
International Formula 3000 drivers
24 Hours of Le Mans drivers
1960 births
Living people
English motorcycle racers
English autobiographers
English male guitarists